Brookesia peyrierasi is a species of diminutive chameleon, a lizard in the family Chamaeleonidae. The species is endemic to north-eastern Madagascar.  It is known commonly as Peyrieras's pygmy chameleon, named after the herpetologist André Peyriéras.

Similar species
A 1999 paper in the Journal of Zoology disputed a 1995 paper which considered this species and B. tuberculata to be the same species as B. minima.  The later paper discussed the same details as the first – subtle morphological differences in the hemipenises of the respective species and determined they were not conspecific.  They also found differences in the arrangement of head crests and in minute spines above the eyes.

Habitat
The natural habitat of B. peyrierasi is forest.

Reproduction
B. peyrierasi is oviparous.

References

Further reading
Brygoo E-R, Domergue CA (1975). "Notes sur les Brookesia de Madagascar. IX. Observations sur B. tuberculata Mocquard, 1894, B. ramanantsoai sp. nov. et B. peyrierasi nom. nov. (Reptilia, Squamata, Chamaeleontidae)". Bulletin du Muséum national d'Histoire naturelle, Paris 189 (276): 1769–1782. (Brookesia peyrierasi, new species). (in French).
Glaw F, Vences M (1994). A Fieldguide to the Amphibians and Reptiles of Madagascar, Second Edition. Cologne, Germany: Vences & Glaw Verlag / Serpents Tale. 480 pp. . (Brookesia peyrierasi, p. 235).
Klaver C, Böhme W (1997). "Chamaeleonidae".  Das Tierreich 112: xiv + 1-85. 
Martin J (1992). Masters of Disguise: A Natural History of Chameleons. New York: Facts On File, Inc.
Nečas P (1999). Chameleons: Nature's Hidden Jewels. Malabar, Florida: Krieger Publishing Company.

P
Endemic fauna of Madagascar
Reptiles of Madagascar
Endangered fauna of Africa
Reptiles described in 1974
Taxa named by Édouard-Raoul Brygoo
Taxa named by Charles Domergue